Marathi Keertan Or " Kirtan " is an art of spiritual teaching through story-telling.  It is typically performed by one or two main performers, called Keertankar, accompanied by Harmonium,  Castanets/chiplya/Kartal/Khartal, Manjeera/Taal/Jhaanj/cymbals, Tambori,  Mridang/Pakhwaj  and Tabla musicians.  It involves singing, acting, dancing, and story-telling, However it is unlike any other performing art as it is basically pure glorification of god and godly acts.

Based on the format and subjects, Keertan / Kirtan has been classified into several types, described in the sections below.

Origin 
In Indian mythology the story of Bhakta Prahlad is famous for the uninterrupted devotion of a small child towards the almighty God, despite the obstacles created by his own father demon Hiranyakashipu. In the same "Avatar katha" child Prahlad the heavenly prince defines 9 types of "Bhakti" devotion. The relevant shloka
 says,

Shrawanam keertanam vishnoh smaranam padsevanam |
Archanam vandanam dasyam sakhyam atmanivedanam ||

Meaning -There are 9 types (stages) of "Bhakti" or ways of devotion.
 Shravanam- Hearing stories of the god or heavenly virtues.
 Keertanam- Admire and sing the songs of god and goodness.
 Smaranam- Remembering god and goodness.
 Paad sevanam- Offering services to Godly places and godly work.
 Archanam- Performing pooja or offering decorations and comforts to god and good people.
 Vandanam- Respects feet of the almighty.
 Daasyam- Selfless and uninterrupted services to god. 
 Sakhyam- Making friendship with god, without material expectations. 
 Atmanivedanam- Offering one's everything to god without leaving back anything.

The second type namely, "Keertan or Kirtan" as is called is performing art of presenting sayings from old good books and mythological literature along with a tint of music, dance, humor, etc. Due to scarce means of transport and communications, the performers called Keertankars use to travel a lot. Town to town and place to place over long periods and offer performances so as to enlighten the people.  All over India this form of devotion is still live and prevalent in one form or another. All states have Keertans in Temples, Gurudwaras, mandirs and holy festival places too.

Keertan is also called Hari Keertan, Katha or Harikatha, Sankirtan, Nam sankeertan, etc. Keertan carries a tradition as old as times of age old muni Narada the best devotee of lord Vishnu. Naradiya keertan follows a format that is named after Narada the sacred son of Brahmadev or lord Brahma
.

Naradiya Keertan 

or "Naradiya Kirtan" an age old form of devotion,admire of gods and godly acts,glorification of the almighty,and also a tool used by the performers to keep people updated on the world out of their towns and also to educate the masses about good values of life and very purpose of human life,through a medium of "ONE MAN SHOW" consisting of prose and musical performance given at the temples and other holy places.

Structure 
In this format Keertan is divided into 5 parts
,
 Naman or prayer
 Main spiritual and philosophical lesson called "Purvaranga" (First of the two major part)based on old epics. 
 Chanting the holy name of god,in between.
 A story suitable to support the spiritual teaching in first half called "katha or Akhyan" "Uttarranga" (Second of the two major parts)
 Final prayer for universal welfare and well being of people.

It lasts for period of any length, ideally for half an hour to 3 hours at a stretch.

Dress code

Gentlemen 
There are no hard and fast written rules, and different dress codes are prevalent in different geographic and social environments. However, by convention and as an age old practice and tradition, men wear
 
 White 9 yards cotton clothing dhoti.(performers of Ramdasi keertankars prefer clothing in saffron colour.)
 Knee long kurta with full sleeves, often called "Barabandi (that apparel has no buttons but 12 tags to tie or top called Zabba that is very common during festive occasions"
 A white or colored turban or "Puneri Pagadi" (a special crownlike decorative traditional headgear that is a cap, usually in saffron color) on the head.
 A 2 yard long colored "uttareeya or uparane "hanging on shoulders.
 The performer stands barefoot on a special mattress.musician with harmonium at his left and tabala on his right side.
 Fresh flower garland.
 Red or saffron kumkum or sandlewood tilak tilak on his forehead.(sometimes black colored "Bukka" also preferred especially by those practicing " varkari keertan".)

Ladies 

 Usually wear the traditional Indian 6 yards or 9 yards  "Sahawari/Nauwari",saree "Patal/Lugdey". Also sometimes shawl ( cotton or silken ) "utteriya or Shela"that covers the shoulders 
 Traditional ornaments including ear rings typically round "Kudya" ,bracelets or bangles ,Necklace , nose rings "Nath" of different decors.
 fresh flower Garland, flowers decorating hair too.)
 Red Kumkum  tilak on forehead.

The performer has accomplishment of musical instruments like harmonium, drums and string instruments of various types mostly "Zanz","chipali", "Tal" or "Chimata".Performer needs to study a lot of things in literature, music dance, humor and acting. He has to be a good orator and able debating artist. Usually the subjects are full of devotion, sacrifice, kindness, bravery, values of life, extinguishing ills of life, personal development of each individual physically and spiritually.

A lot of reading, practice of debating, musical training, sound memory and all round knowledge only can make a good performer in Keertan.  But after all, the main cause and purpose of Keertan is "glorification of god and godly acts"

Training 

The main institute for training is "Keertan Kul", with office situated at Sangli and the "Shankaracharya of Karaveer Peeth " as Chair person.  There are some institutes offering the training in Keertan apart from individual schools and coaching classes in small towns all over India.

Marathi Naradiya keertan is taught at the following locations in its formal traditional way:
 Akhil Bharatiya Keertan Sanstha at Dadar, Mumbai
 Narad Mandir at Sadashiv Peth, Pune
 Kavikulaguru Kalidas Sanskrit University at Ramtek, Nagpur

There are also some smaller schools at Goa, Beed and Ujjain.

These are working as independent autonomous bodies.  Different institutes offer education in different languages as suitable for the students and audiences around e.g. Institutes in Maharashtra prefer Marathi medium while those in Karnataka go for Kannada, Hindi is medium in U P and M.P,and Punjabi in Punjab and so on. Some have started training in various mediums including Hindi and English too along with the local language.

Naradiya Keertan knows no boundaries. It accepts saying from great authors all over the world, if they suit their subject under consideration as to prove the principle or spiritual lessons. The training is also available by postal course also if one wants to do it at home as self studying, with outside guidance in literature and music.A good knowledge of "Sanskrit" the ancient language of India is essential for a best performer.Mostly it tells stories of old mythology and religious deeds of great lives including god and godly men.

Rashtriya Keertan 
having taken inspiration from Indian freedom fighter Lokmanya Tilak, a medical practitioner from a small town of Wai- district Satara shri Dattopant Patwardhan, left his profession and became the pioneer of this form of Naradiya Keertan . He started this new era of Rashtriya keertan. he used the format of Naradiya keertan to teach masses and make awareness amongst them about the struggle for freedom against the British regime. He used many mythological stories from great epics which gave the message to masses and encouraged the movement for liberty.
In modern times, stories of great scientists, warriors, freedom fighters and social reformers National leaders, battles fought,  etc.are conveniently selected to entertain and educate the masses. So, Naradiya keertan is still a popular tool of mass education .It serves today as an art of spiritual training through entertainment. It is devotion with added stint of an art.

Ramdasi Keertan 

This form was named after Samarth Ramdas.  Here the format is like Naradiya Keertan, only difference is it is based on poetry by Samarth Ramdas, and mostly the stories selected are from "Ramayana". In between chanting is also dedicated to lord Ram, glorifying his deeds and bravery. In his world known book "Dasbodh", Samarth Ramdas has explained in detail how a keertan should be performed effectively.

Varkari Keertan 
Varkari Keertan was pioneered by Sant Namdev around 900 years back in Maharashtra.  It is usually based on poetry of 7 famous saints of Maharashtra namely, Saint Nivruttinath, Sant Dnyaneshwar, Sopandev, Muktabai, saint Eknath, Saint Namdev, and Saint Tukaram maharaj.  Sometimes other sayings of saints are chosen.

The show goes for 2 or 3 hours as time permits and is not divided into parts like "Naradiya Keertan".  This form was effectively performed for years by personalities like "Hari Bhakti Parayan" (sincere devotee of god) Sonopant (mama) Dandekar, Dhunda maharaj Deglurkar, Babamaharaj Satarkar, Dekhanebuwa, and many others in modern times. An institute at Alandi near Pune offers training in this form of Keertan.

Jugalbandi Keertan 

This format is just like Naradiya Keertan. It was most evolved form that is performed by two persons together. The philosophy is presented from all angles, sometimes contradicting each other. The performance is more interesting as it goes in question-Answer form, sometimes creating a dialogue with audiences also. Finally both the performers come to a conclusion that gives some spiritual lesson for the listeners.

References

Performing arts in India

mr:कीर्तन